Nedystoma is a genus of sea catfishes endemic to the island of New Guinea where they are found in fresh and brackish waters in both the Indonesian portion and in Papua New Guinea.  There are currently two described species in this genus.

Species
 Nedystoma dayi (E. P. Ramsay & J. D. Ogilby, 1886) (Day's catfish)
 Nedystoma novaeguineae (M. C. W. Weber, 1913) (Spoon-snouted catfish)

References
 

Ariidae
Fish of New Guinea
Taxa named by James Douglas Ogilby
Catfish genera